Bobbili Estate was a Zamindari in the Vizagapatam District of the Madras Presidency, presently in the Vizianagaram district, Andhra Pradesh, India. It comprises 153 Jeroyati villages, 53 Agraharams, 5 Mokhasas by 1907 and a revenue of 8,33,000/- by 1938. It is one of the most influential Zamindari. It is spread over 300 square miles. It also bought shares in many estates like Kirlampudi, Dontamuru etc. It prospered in the period of British Raj.

History 
The Zamindars of this estate belong to the Venkatagiri estate Royal family. The 21st descendant of the Venkatagiri Estate owners named Pedda Rayudu. During the campaign of Shere Mohammad Khan, Nawab of chicacole to the circar districts, Pedda Rayudu accompanied him and proved his valour for which he was awarded the title, Ranga Rao as hereditary title and Rajam Hunda for lease. The Zamindar built a new fort and named the place Bobbili (originally Bebbuli which means Tiger or Sher). They were continuously in fight with Vizianagaram Rajah's which led to the Battle of Bobbili.

Battle of Bobbili 

The battle of Bobbili in 1757, is a significant episode in the history of the region. It was between Vizianagaram and French General Marquis de Bussy against Bobbili. The army of Bobbili faced the Vizianagaram-French allies with tremendous valour but lost the war and the heir evaded from the battlefield. He later re-established the territory during the British reign.

During British Reign 
This estate prospered during the British reign. They paid a peskash of 89,774/- by 1877. They got the hereditary tile of Raja and Personal distinction of Maharaja.

Relations 
The Zamindars of Bobbili are closely related to the Nuzvid Estate Raja's through marital alliances. Pithapuram Estate , Venkatagiri estate, and Jetprole royal families are very closely related to Bobbili Royal family as they are all claim their descent from the same ancestor.

Further reading 
Ramakrishna Ranga Rao of Bobbili
Sir Venkata Svetachalapathi Ranga Rao Bahadur GCIE
Battle of Bobbili
Bobbili Fort
A revised and enlarged account of the Bobbili zemindari , by Sir Venkata Svetachalapathi Ranga Rao Bahadur GCIE, Maharaja of Bobbili in 1907.

References 

Zamindari estates
History of Andhra Pradesh
Madras Presidency